Feufollet is an Americana/Cajun band from Lafayette, Louisiana.

History

Awards
The band has been recognized through awards including receiving a nomination for the Grammy Award for Best Zydeco or Cajun Music Album for its album En Couleurs (2010).  It also received the Big Easy Award for "Best Cajun Band".

Personnel

Singer and rhythm guitarist Anna Laura Edmiston—a member of the band since 2003—left the band in 2012 to pursue other interests. She was replaced by Kelli Jones-Savoy.

Members

 Philippe Billeaudeaux
 Kelli Jones-Savoy
 Chris Segura
 Chris Stafford
 Mike Stafford
 Andrew Toups

Discography

Studio albums
 La Bande Feufollet (1999)
 Belle Louisiane (2001)
 Tout Un Beau Soir (2004)
 Cow Island Hop (2008) Valcour Records
 En Couleurs (2010)
 Two Universes (2015)
 Baby's On Fire - single (2018?) Valcour Records

Collaboration albums
 Color Sessions (2011)
 En Francais: Cajun 'n' Creole Rock 'n' Roll Various, produced by Louis Michot of Lost Bayou Ramblers (2011) Bayou Teche Brewery/CD Baby

See also

 List of people related to Cajun music
 Music of Louisiana

References

External links
 
 

Year of establishment missing
Cajun musicians
Culture of Lafayette, Louisiana
Musical groups from Louisiana
Zydeco musicians